Nate Potter (born May 16, 1988) is an American football coach and former player who is currently the run game coordinator and tight ends coach at Boise State University and was previously the tight ends coach at Montana State University. He played college football for Boise State University and was recognized as an All-American. The Arizona Cardinals of the National Football League drafted him in the seventh round of the 2012 NFL Draft. Potter appeared in 21 games over two seasons before the Cardinals released him at the end of the 2014 preseason, after which he began his college coaching career.

Early years
Potter was born in Denver, Colorado.  He attended Timberline High School in Boise and was a standout lineman for the Timberline Wolves high school football team.

College career
Potter attended Boise State University, where he played for the Boise State Broncos football team from 2008 to 2011.  He grayshirted and later redshirted in 2007.  In 2008, he started three games at left tackle and five games at right tackle for the Broncos.

Potter earned ESPN's second-team Academic All-America honors on November 23, 2010. He earned first-team All-WAC honors for the second straight season following the 2010 season. In 2011, Potter was a consensus All-American.

Professional career
Potter was drafted by the Arizona Cardinals in the seventh round of the 2012 NFL Draft. He played eight games that season. He was released with an injury settlement on August 30, 2014.

References

External links
Montana State profile
Boise State Broncos football bio

1988 births
Living people
All-American college football players
American football offensive tackles
American football offensive guards
Arizona Cardinals players
Boise State Broncos football players
Boise State Broncos football coaches
College of Idaho Coyotes football coaches
Montana State Bobcats football coaches
Sportspeople from Boise, Idaho
Players of American football from Idaho